Frank J. Murphy Jr. (born January 19, 1934) is an American politician in the state of California. He served in the California State Assembly as a Republican for the 31st and 28th district from 1967 to 1976.

References

1934 births
Living people
Republican Party members of the California State Assembly
People from Santa Cruz, California